Abigail "Aby" Palmares Maraño (born December 22, 1992) is a Filipino professional volleyball player who plays for F2 Logistics Cargo Movers in the Premier Volleyball League.

Early life and education
Maraño was born on December 22, 1992, and is 175 cm tall. She took up Bachelor of Arts in Philippine Studies major in Filipino in Mass Media at De La Salle University.

Career
Maraño was a two-time UAAP Most Valuable Player, having won the award in the UAAP Season 74 and Season 75 and former team captain (2012-2014) of the De La Salle University Lady Spikers. She began her commercial league career in the PSL, where she was selected as the second overall draft pick for the 2014 season for the AirAsia Flying Spikers.
She played with Don Antonio de Zuzuarregui Sr Memorial Academy and De La Salle University Lady Spikers from (2009-2014). In 2014 she was the top drafted by AirAsia Flying Spikers from the Philippine Super Liga. Shen then played with the Shakey's V-League club Meralco Power Spikers.
She played the 2015 Philippine Super Liga season with Petron Blaze Spikers. In 2016 she played with Foton Tornadoes as a guest player during the 2016 Asian Club Championship.

With F2 Logistics Cargo Movers, Maraño won the 2017 PSL Grand Prix Conference championship.

Clubs
  AirAsia Flying Spikers (2014)
  PLDT Home Telpad Turbo Boosters (2014)
  Meralco Power Spikers (2014-2015)
  Generika Lifesavers (2014)
  Petron Blaze Spikers (2015)
  Philippine Army Lady Troopers (2015)
  Foton Tornadoes (2016)
  F2 Logistics Cargo Movers (2016–present)

Awards

Individuals
 UAAP Season 74 "Most Valuable Player"
 UAAP Season 75 "Most Valuable Player"
 UAAP Season 75 "Best Blocker"
 Shakey's V-League 11th Season Reinforced Open Conference "Best Blocker"
 2014 Philippine Super Liga All-Filipino "1st Best Middle Blocker"
 2014 Philippine Super Liga Grand Prix "1st Best Middle Blocker"
 2015 Philippine Super Liga All-Filipino "2nd Best Middle Blocker"
 2016 Philippine Super Liga Invitational "1st Best Middle Blocker"
 2016 Philippine Super Liga All-Filipino "1st Best Middle Blocker"
 2016 Philippine Super Liga Grand Prix "1st Best Middle Blocker"
 2018 Philippine Super Liga Grand Prix "1st Best Middle Blocker"
 2019 Philippine Super Liga Grand Prix "Best Middle Blocker (Local)"
 2021 PNVF Champions League for Women "1st Best Middle Blocker"

Others
  2014 PSA Ms. Volleyball
 2017 DLSAA Lasallian Sports Achievement Award
 2017 Philippine Superliga Ambassadress

Collegiate
 2010 UAAP Season 72 volleyball tournaments -  Silver medal, with De La Salle Lady Spikers
 2011 UAAP Season 73 volleyball tournaments -  Champion, with De La Salle Lady Spikers
 2012 UAAP Season 74 volleyball tournaments -  Champion, with De La Salle Lady Spikers
 2013 UAAP Season 75 volleyball tournaments -  Champion, with De La Salle Lady Spikers
 2014 UAAP Season 76 volleyball tournaments -  Silver medal, with De La Salle Lady Spikers

Clubs
 2014 PSL All-Filipino Conference - 4th placer, with AirAsia Flying Spikers
 2014 PSL Grand Prix Conference -  Silver medal, with Generika Lifesavers
 2014 Shakey's V-League 11th Season Reinforced Open Conference - 4th placer, with Meralco Power Spikers
 2015 Shakey's V-League 12th Season Open Conference - 4th placer, with Meralco Power Spikers
 2015 Shakey's V-League 12th Season Reinforced Open Conference -  Silver medal, with Philippine Army Lady Troopers
 2015 PSL All-Filipino Conference –  Champion, with Petron Blaze Spikers
 2015 PSL Grand Prix Conference -  Silver medal, with Petron Blaze Spikers
 2016 PSL Invitational Cup -  Bronze medal, with F2 Logistics Cargo Movers
 2016 PSL All-Filipino Conference –  Champion, with F2 Logistics Cargo Movers
 2016 PSL Grand Prix Conference -  Bronze medal, with F2 Logistics Cargo Movers
 2017 PSL All-Filipino Conference -  Silver medal, with F2 Logistics Cargo Movers
 2017 Sealect Tuna Volleyball Cup -  Bronze medal, with PSL All-Stars
 2017 PSL Grand Prix Conference -  Champion, with F2 Logistics Cargo Movers
 2018 PSL Grand Prix Conference -  Silver medal, with F2 Logistics Cargo Movers
 2018 PSL Invitational Cup -  Champion, with F2 Logistics Cargo Movers
 2018 PSL All-Filipino Conference -  Silver medal, with F2 Logistics Cargo Movers
 2019 PSL Grand Prix Conference -  Silver medal, with F2 Logistics Cargo Movers
 2019 PSL All-Filipino Conference –  Champion, with F2 Logistics Cargo Movers
 2019 PSL Invitational Conference -  Champion, with F2 Logistics Cargo Movers
 2021 PNVF Champions League for Women -  Champion, with F2 Logistics Cargo Movers

References

External links

1992 births
University Athletic Association of the Philippines volleyball players
Living people
Middle blockers
De La Salle University alumni
Sportspeople from Iloilo
Philippines women's international volleyball players
Filipino women's volleyball players
Competitors at the 2017 Southeast Asian Games
Volleyball players at the 2018 Asian Games
Competitors at the 2019 Southeast Asian Games
Asian Games competitors for the Philippines
Competitors at the 2021 Southeast Asian Games
Southeast Asian Games competitors for the Philippines